The Embarrassment of Riches is a 1918 American silent comedy film directed by Edward Dillon and starring Lillian Walker, Carlton Brickert and John Costello.

Cast
 Lillian Walker as Elizabeth Holt
 Carlton Brickert as John Russell
 John Costello as William Gildersleeve
 Edward Keenan as Bobby Gildersleeve
 Henry Sedley as Count Orloff
 Edward Roseman as Leighton Craig
 Harriet Ross as Mrs. Goodwin
 Reeva Greenwood as Alma Goodwin
 Peggy Lundeen as Miss Partridge
 Howard Truesdale as Ted Phelan
 John T. Dillon as Jim Connors 
 William Sloan as Mike

References

Bibliography
 Wakeman, John. World Film Directors: 1890-1945. H.W. Wilson, 1987.

External links
 

1918 films
1918 comedy films
1910s English-language films
American silent feature films
Silent American comedy films
American black-and-white films
Films directed by Edward Dillon
Films distributed by W. W. Hodkinson Corporation
1910s American films